The Canon Cinema EOS (Cinema Electro-Optical System) autofocus digital photographic and cinematographic SLR and mirrorless interchangeable lens camera system was introduced in late 2011 with the Canon EOS C300 and followed by the Canon EOS C500 and Canon EOS 1D C in early 2012.

History
Cinema EOS is a branch off from the existing EOS line of cameras that date back to 1987 with the introduction of the analog Canon EOS 650. With many Canon DSLRs adding motion video capabilities starting with the Canon EOS 5D Mark II in 2008, Canon decided to focus on making cameras specially designed for motion video instead of just producing still video cameras with some motion video capabilities.

The Cinema EOS line launched in late 2011, with a multi-day gala event held at Paramount Studios.  Director Martin Scorsese spoke and four films (directed by Sam Nicholson, ASC; Vincent LaForet, Richard Crudo, ASC and Felix Alcala ASC/Larry Carroll) shot with the new Canon C300MkI as well as accompanying Behind the Scenes films were presented.  Products introduced included the C300 and new CN-E lenses (with both Canon EF and Arri PL mounts). 

In early 2012, Canon began to expand the Cinema EOS line with the C500, which added 4K/QHD recording and RAW capture to the existing features of the C300. The new C500 would  be the first camera to offer uncompressed raw motion video recording.

Canon also announced a variant of the Canon EOS-1D X, called the Canon EOS-1D C, which featured 4K (but not raw) recording on the same sensor. The new split in the Canon EOS 1D series follows its recent reunification of the high resolution line (1D S) and high speed line (1D) in 2011.

Additional announcements included an upcoming Canon camera that would feature 4K motion video capabilities in a DSLR body. The demonstration of a prototype device from Canon was a rarity and was seen as a sign of their intent to enter the new still and motion camera market.

In 2019 Canon released the Canon EOS C500 Mark II, a revision on the previous C500 model. This upgraded version included a Full Frame 5.9K sensor (the same sensor as the larger C700 FF camera), and allowed raw recording onto CFexpress type B cards. The camera featured a higher dynamic range with a claimed 15+ stops. The camera also features a built in ND filter system.

In early 2020 Canon would release the Canon EOS C300 Mark III, a Super 35 4K camera which shares a similar body to the C500 Mark II. The camera allows raw recording to CFexpress type B cards, and features a dual gain output sensor, allowing for a claimed dynamic range of 16+ stops. The camera also features a built in ND filter system. 

In late 2020 Canon released the C70, a camera bridging DSLR video shooters with cinema camera users. It includes all of the features of the larger C300 Mark III (which shares the same sensor) in a smaller body that is more appealing to indie filmmakers. The camera uses Canon's latest lens mount, RF. The RF mount features a shorter flange depth allowing easy lenses from other mounts (like the more common cine lens mounts like PL or EF) to be adapted to it. It has features like a dedicated timecode port, user assignable buttons, built in ND filters, an array of audio ports, and Canon's full suite of monitoring tools.

In 2022 Canon released the R5 C, a cinema version of their R5 mirrorless stills camera. It is a Full Frame camera with an RF mount, and allows for 8K internal raw recording.

Cameras
 2011 - Canon EOS C300 - 2K/HD MPEG recording 
 2012 - Canon EOS 1D C - 4K/QHD and 2K/HD MJPEG
 2012 - Canon EOS C100 - HD MPEG recording
 2012 - Canon EOS C500 - 4K/QHD and 2K/HD RAW recording
 2014 - Canon EOS C100 Mark II - HD recording, improved Auto Focus.
 2015 - Canon EOS C300 Mark II - 12-bit 2K/HD, 4K/UHD
 2016 - Canon EOS C700 - 4.5K CMOS sensor
 2017 - Canon EOS C200 - Internal 4K RAW
 2017 - Canon EOS C200B - Internal 4K RAW
 2018 - Canon EOS C700 FF, 5.9K Full Frame sensor, 4K/UHD 
 2019 - Canon EOS C500 Mark II - 5.9K Full Frame sensor, 4K/UHD 
 2020 - Canon EOS C300 Mark III - 4K/UHD
 2020 - Canon EOS C70 - 4K/UHD up to 120FPS, 4:2:2 10 bit, Compressed Raw 
 2022 - Canon EOS R5 C - DCI 8K Full Frame RAW

Future - Cinema EOS 8K - Super 35 8K Raw

Lenses
Canon has released a series of cinema-specific lenses using the CN-E designation.

Nomenclature

CN-E - Cinema EOS
S - Super 35 mm
F - Full 35 mm
P - PL mount
EF - EF mount
L - (Luxury)

Full Frame

Canon EF Mount

Prime lenses
CN-E 14mm T3.1 L F (2013)
CN-E 24mm T1.5 L F (2011)
CN-E 50mm T1.3 L F (2011)
CN-E 85mm T1.3 L F (2011)  
CN-E135mm T2.2 L F (2013)

Zoom lenses

 CN20x50 Cine-Servo 50-1000mm T5.0-8.9 (2014) 
 CN10X25 Cine-Servo 25-250mm T2.95-3.9 (2020) 
 CN-E 20-50mm T2.4 LF (2022) 
 CN-E 45-135mm T2.4 LF (2022) 
 CN8x15 IAS S E1/P1 Cine-Servo 15-120mm T2.95-3.95 (2022) 

The CN20x50, CN10X25, and CN8x15 are primarily Super 35 lenses that have a built in 1.5X extender which allows them to cover Full Frame when in use

Arri PL Mount

Prime lenses 

 14mm Sumire Prime T3.1 (2019)
 20mm Sumire Prime T1.5 (2019)
 24mm Sumire Prime T1.5 (2019)
 35mm Sumire Prime T1.5 (2019)
 50mm Sumire Prime T1.3 (2019)
 85mm Sumire Prime T1.3 (2019)
 135mm Sumire Prime T2.2 (2019)

Zoom lenses 

 CN20x50 Cine-Servo 50-1000mm T5.0-8.9 (2014)
 CN10X25 Cine-Servo 25-250mm T2.95-3.9 (2020) 
 CN-E 20-50mm T2.4 LF (2022)
 CN-E 45-135mm T2.4 LF (2022)
 CN8x15 IAS S E1/P1 Cine-Servo 15-120mm T2.95-3.95 (2022) (2022)

The CN20x50, CN10X25, and CN8x15 are primarily Super 35 lenses that have a built in 1.5X extender which allows them to cover Full Frame when in use

Super 35 mm

Canon EF Mount

Prime lenses
The Full Frame CN-E Prime lenses also fully cover Super 35.

Zoom lenses
CN-E 14.5-60mm T2.6 L S (2011)
CN-E 30-300mm T2.95-3.7 L S (2011) 
CN-E 15.5-47mm T2.8 L S (2012)
CN-E 30-105mm T2.8 L S (2012)
CN7x17 KAS S Cine-Servo 17-120mm T2.95 (2014)
CN20x50 Cine-Servo 50-1000mm T5.0-8.9 (2014)
CN-E 18-80mm T4.4 L IS (2016)
CN-E 70-200mm T4.4 L IS (2017)
CN10X25 Cine-Servo 25-250mm T2.95-3.9 (2020)
CN8x15 IAS S E1/P1 Cine-Servo 15-120mm T2.95-3.95 (2022)

Arri PL Mount

Prime lenses
The Full Frame Sumire Prime lenses also fully cover Super 35.

Zoom lenses
CN-E 14.5-60mm T2.6 L S P (2011)
CN-E 30-300mm T2.95-3.7 L S P (2011)
CN-E 15.5-47mm T2.8 L S P (2012)
CN-E 30-105mm T2.8 L S P (2012)
CN7x17 KAS S Cine-Servo 17-120mm T2.95 (2014)
CN20x50 Cine-Servo 50-1000mm T5.0-8.9 (2014)
CN10X25 Cine-Servo 25-250mm T2.95-3.9 (2020)
CN8x15 IAS S E1/P1 Cine-Servo 15-120mm T2.95-3.95 (2022)

References 
10. https://www.bestbuyingguide.in/2020/10/finally-canon-eos-c70-launched-in-india.html?m=1. Canon first dslr type cinema camera.

External links
 Cinema EOS Camera Systems homepage at Canon.com

Canon EOS cameras
Canon SLR cameras
Canon camcorders
Digital movie cameras
Movie cameras
Movie camera manufacturers